The 1902–03 Scottish Districts season is a record of all the rugby union matches for Scotland's district teams.

History

Edinburgh District and Glasgow District drew nil-nil in the Inter-City match.

Results

Inter-City

Glasgow District:

Edinburgh District:

Other Scottish matches

North of Scotland:

South-Western District: 

South of Scotland:

Anglo-Scots: 

Cities District:

Provinces District:

English matches

No other District matches played.

International matches

Glasgow District:

Canada: 

North of Scotland District:

Canada:

References

1902–03 in Scottish rugby union
Scottish Districts seasons